William Gemmell Cochran (15 July 1909 – 29 March 1980) was a prominent statistician. He was born in Scotland but spent most of his life in the United States.

Cochran studied mathematics at the University of Glasgow and the University of Cambridge. He worked at Rothamsted Experimental Station from 1934 to 1939, when he moved to the United States. There he helped establish several departments of statistics. His longest spell in any one university was at Harvard, which he joined in 1957 and from which he retired in 1976.

Writings
Cochran wrote many articles and books. His books became standard texts:
 Experimental Designs (with Gertrude Mary Cox) 1950 

 Statistical Methods Applied to Experiments in Agriculture and Biology by George W. Snedecor (Cochran contributed from the fifth (1956) edition) 
 Planning and Analysis of Observational Studies (edited by Lincoln E. Moses and Frederick Mosteller) 1983.

References

External links
 Brief biography 
  ASA biography 
 Morris Hansen and Frederick Mosteller (1987) William Gemmell Cochran NAS Biographical Memoirs V.56 
 
 
Morris Hansen and Frederick Mosteller, "William Gemmell Cochran", Biographical Memoirs of the National Academy of Sciences (1987)
 "Designing Clinical Trials" (1961; Evaluation of Drug Therapy)

1909 births
1980 deaths
American statisticians
British statisticians
Harvard University faculty
20th-century British mathematicians
Presidents of the American Statistical Association
Presidents of the Institute of Mathematical Statistics
Presidents of the International Statistical Institute
Rothamsted statisticians
Fellows of the American Statistical Association
Survey methodologists
People from Rutherglen
Members of the United States National Academy of Sciences
Alumni of the University of Glasgow
Alumni of the University of Cambridge
Mathematical statisticians